The following is a list of ecoregions in Costa Rica. Ecoregions cover relatively large areas of land or water, and contain characteristic, geographically distinct assemblages of natural communities and species. The biodiversity of flora, fauna and ecosystems that characterise an ecoregion tends to be distinct from that of other ecoregions. Ecoregions are grouped into larger bioregions, which in turn form the eight biogeographic realms of the Earth's surface. Costa Rica is a country in Central America, bordered by Nicaragua to the north, Panama to the southeast, the Pacific Ocean to the west, and the Caribbean Sea to the east. It contains 5% of the world's biodiversity.

Terrestrial ecoregions
Costa Rica is in the Neotropical realm and Central America bioregion, and divided into the following terrestrial ecoregions, organized by biome:
Tropical and subtropical moist broadleaf forests
Central American Atlantic moist forests
Cocos Island moist forests
Costa Rican seasonal moist forests
Isthmian–Atlantic moist forests
Isthmian–Pacific moist forests
Talamancan montane forests
Tropical and subtropical dry broadleaf forests
Central American dry forests
Montane grasslands and shrublands
 [Talamanca Paramo] 
Mangrove
Bocas del Toro–San Bastimentos Island–San Blas mangroves
Moist Pacific Coast mangroves
Rio Negro–Rio San Sun mangroves
Southern Dry Pacific Coast mangroves

Freshwater ecoregions
 Chiriqui
 Estero Real–Tempisque
 Isthmus Caribbean
 San Juan (Nicaragua/Costa Rica)

Marine ecoregions
Costa Rica's Pacific coast is in the Tropical Eastern Pacific marine realm, and the Caribbean coast is in the Tropical Atlantic marine realm.

Tropical Atlantic
 Southwestern Caribbean

Tropical Eastern Pacific
 Chiapas-Nicaragua
 Nicoya
 Cocos Island

References

 
Eco
Costa Rica